Events in the year 1573 in Japan.

Events
January 25 – Battle of Mikatagahara; Takeda Shingen defeats Tokugawa Ieyasu.

References

 
1570s in Japan
Japan
Years of the 16th century in Japan